Tlaxcala Fútbol Club, commonly known as Coyotes de Tlaxcala, is a Mexican football club based in Tlaxcala. The club was founded in 2014, and currently plays in the second tier, Liga de Expansión MX. Tlaxcala won automatic promotion to Ascenso MX in the 2016–17 season, but their promotion was put on hold until the 2018–19 season as their stadium failed to meet league requirements. However, in 2020 the club was invited to the Liga de Expansión, the new second level league and thus promoted category.

History 
The team was founded on September 5, 2014 after the merger of the Club Águilas Reales de Zacatecas and the Tercera División team of C.F. Pachuca, the Zacatecan team gave up their rights to participate in the Segunda División while Pachuca contributed the sports part of the organization.  Previously in Summer 2014, Tlaxcala City had been left without football due to the move of Linces de Tlaxcala to Acapulco, where the team was renamed as Internacional de Acapulco, while Águilas Reales de Zacatecas became a secondary team due to the arrival of Mineros de Zacatecas, a team that shared ownership with Tlaxcala F.C. until 2020. 

Tlaxcala won automatic promotion to Ascenso MX after winning the two season tournaments against Irapuato during the 2016–17 season, but their promotion was put on hold until before the 2018–19 season as their stadium failed to meet league requirements. They played in Serie B for 2017–18 season so they can met requirements to play in Ascenso MX but their spot was revoked after the stadium was not completed at the deadline to meet the requirements, so they moved to Serie A for 2018–19 season. In 2018–19 season, the team played as local at Unidad Deportiva Próspero Cahuantzi at Chiautempan, for 2019–20, they moved to the Unidad Deportiva José Brindis in Nanacamilpa awaiting the end of the construction works of the Estadio Tlahuicole.

In July 2020, Tlaxcala F.C. was invited to the new Liga de Expansión MX, which became the second category of Mexican football instead of the Ascenso MX, with this the team occupied its place in the division after three years of having achieved sports promotion. On August 19, 2020, the club debuted in the Liga de Expansión, defeating Mineros de Zacatecas 1–2. On September 2, Tlaxcala received Celaya F.C. in its first home game, which had to be played in Nanacamilpa because the Tlahuicole Stadium was not yet ready to host professional football matches, finally, on September 15, Tlaxcala was able to return to its stadium in the match against Leones Negros UdeG, which was won by the Guadalajara team.

Personnel

Coaching staff

Players

Current squad

Managers
  Pablo Sabater (2014–2015)
  Silvio Rudman (2016–2018)
  Miguel Gómez (2018)
  Isidro Sánchez (2018–2019)
  Lorenzo Sáez (2019–2020)
  Irving Rubirosa (2020–2021)
  Silvio Rudman (2021)
  Juan Antonio Torres (2021–2022)
  Jorge Villalpando (2022-present)

Badge

Honours

Segunda División de México/Liga Premier de México: 2
Apertura 2016, Clausura 2017

References

External links 

 
Sport in Tlaxcala
Association football clubs established in 2014
2014 establishments in Mexico
Liga Premier de México